The 1965 Kakanj mine disaster was a mining accident on 7 June 1965 at a Kakanj coal mine  in Kakanj, SR Bosnia and Herzegovina, SFR Yugoslavia.

Background
A methane gas explosion at the Orasi mine shaft of the Kakanj mine caused a cave-in, which killed 128 miners. There were no survivors. This was the second large-scale mining incident in Kakanj, after the 1934 disaster that killed 127 miners. The Kakanj 1965 disaster remained the worst in the history of Bosnia and Herzegovina until the Dobrnja-Jug mine disaster in 1990.

References

External links
Yugoslavia: The Kakanj Mine Disaster 1965 by British Pathé

 

Coal mining disasters in Bosnia and Herzegovina
1965 mining disasters
History of Kakanj
1965 in Bosnia and Herzegovina